Roy M. Ehrlich (December 6, 1928–November 28, 1997) was an American politician who served as a Republican in the Kansas State Senate and Kansas House of Representatives from 1971 to 1992.

Ehrlich was born in Hoisington, Kansas and worked as a farmer and rancher. He was originally elected to the Kansas House from the 109th district in 1970, switching to the 112th district in 1972 after redistricting; he eventually served five full terms in the state House. In 1980, he ran for the 35th Senate district, and served three terms there. He was succeeded in the legislature by fellow Republican Don Steffes.

References

Republican Party Kansas state senators
Republican Party members of the Kansas House of Representatives
20th-century American politicians
People from Hoisington, Kansas
1928 births
1997 deaths